Altella is a genus of  cribellate araneomorph spiders in the family Dictynidae, and was first described by Eugène Simon in 1884.

Species
 it contains eleven species:
Altella aussereri Thaler, 1990 – Italy
Altella biuncata (Miller, 1949) – Central Europe
Altella caspia Ponomarev, 2008 – Kazakhstan
Altella conglobata Dyal, 1935 – Pakistan
Altella hungarica Loksa, 1981 – Hungary, Ukraine, Russia (Europe)
Altella lucida (Simon, 1874) (type) – Europe, Turkey
Altella media Wunderlich, 1992 – Canary Is.
Altella opaca Simon, 1911 – Algeria
Altella orientalis Balogh, 1935 – Hungary
Altella pygmaea Wunderlich, 1992 – Canary Is.
Altella uncata Simon, 1884 – Algeria

References

Araneomorphae genera
Dictynidae
Spiders of Africa
Spiders of Asia
Taxa named by Eugène Simon